Gertrude Pritzi (15 January 1920 - 21 October 1968) was a female international table tennis player from Austria.

Table tennis career
From 1937 to 1953, she won fourteen medals in singles, doubles and team events in the World Table Tennis Championships. She also won doubles and team medals in the European Table Tennis Championships.

The champion of Women's Singles in 1937 was declared vacant due to time limit rule in force at the time. In 2001, it was decided to declare the two players (i.e., Gertrude Pritzi and Ruth Aarons) Co-Champions.

She began her table tennis career with the association Badner AC, changed 1936 finally to post office sports association Vienna and 1945 to Austria Vienna. In 1937 and 1938 she won and became generally accepted the Austrian championship thereby against the Trude Wildam prevailing at that time.

After the annexation of Austria by Germany, she participated in the World Championships of 1939 for Nazi Germany.

The fourteen World Championship medals included five gold medals; two in the women's singles, one in the women's team event and two in the doubles with Hilde Bussmann and Gizi Farkas.

See also
 List of table tennis players
 List of World Table Tennis Championships medalists

References

1920 births
1968 deaths
Austrian female table tennis players
Sportspeople from Vienna